The Hollywood Film Festival is an annual film festival that takes place in Los Angeles, California, USA.

History
The Hollywood Film Festival was established in 1997 by author and producer Carlos de Abreu and his wife, model Janice Pennington. The festival was created to make a connection between independent filmmakers and the global creative community.

The Hollywood Film Festival is composed of:
 Hollywood Animation Film Festival
 Hollywood Comedy Film Festival
 Hollywood Digital Film Festival
 Hollywood Documentary Film Festival
 Hollywood Horror Film Festival
 Hollywood Independent Film Festival
 Hollywood International Film Festival
 Hollywood Kids Film Festival
 Hollywood Shorts Film Festival
 Hollywood World Film Festival

References

External links
 Official website
 Overview on IMDb.com

.
Film festivals in Los Angeles
Culture of Hollywood, Los Angeles
October events
November events
Film festivals established in 1997
1997 establishments in California